Anyone for Doomsday? is the third full-length album by American rock band Powerman 5000.

Background
The album was originally slated as the follow-up to 1999's Tonight the Stars Revolt!. It was pulled by Powerman 5000 frontman Spider One two weeks before the release date. Due to being too similar to previous work, the album was originally intended to merely be delayed and revamped. However, during this time conflicts began to arise causing longtime members Dorian 27 (Dorian Heartsong) and Al3 (Allen Pahanish) to leave the band. As a result, the album was scrapped due to Spider's unwillingness to release an album of half new members and half old. The album was available for a while on Powerman 5000's official website through Spider One's record label, Megatronic Records. The promotional copies featured artwork that was different from the copies available on the website. The album however was taken down due to legal reasons. The album is now available in full on iTunes and Spotify and the physical copy of the album has become a collectors item.

In other media
"Bombshell"  served as the only single from the album. It has also been used in several notable events, such as the theme song for the professional wrestling tag team Dudley Boyz during the last 18 months of their first WWE tenure. It also appeared on the Freddy vs. Jason soundtrack and in the 2001 film Evolution. and as the theme song in NHL Hitz 20-03, Shaun Palmer's Pro Snowboarder, and SX Superstar.
"Danger Is Go!" is featured on the PlayStation 2 game Frequency.

Track listing

The song "The Future That Never Was" ends at 4:35. After 30 seconds of silence (4:35–5:05), a hidden track starts; it's a strange transmission-like sound with some additional beats before cutting off completely.
 The original version of "Rise" can be found on demo versions of the album.
 "Disease of Machinery" is sometimes listed as "Machines for the Living" on the back

Credits
 Adam 12 – guitar
 Al 3 – drums
 Terry Date – producer
 Dorian 27 – bass
 Spider One – vocals
 M.33 – guitar
 Ulrich Wild – producer
 Ron Handler – A&R

Chart positions
Singles - Billboard (United States)

References

Powerman 5000 albums
Cyberpunk music
2001 albums
Albums produced by Ulrich Wild
Albums produced by Terry Date
DreamWorks Records albums